Lagos State Senior Model College Badore (formerly Lagos State Model College Badore) is a state owned secondary school located in Badore village, Eti-Osa Local government area of Lagos State. It is situated within the same compound as the junior school. It was founded in 1988, along with four other model colleges under the military administration of Captain Okhai Mike Akhigbe, the then Military Governor of Lagos state. The College which was established along with four others took off at Government College, Ketu, Epe. The other four model colleges are Igbonla, Kankon, Meiran and Igbokuta. From the period 1988–1992, the colleges were given necessary foundation and focus on their mission as pacesetters in academics and co-curricular endeavours. Students at the sister Model College Igbonla won laurels in programmes by the Directorate of Food Roads and Rural Infrastructure (DFRRI), the All Nigeria Confederation of Principals of Secondary Schools (ANCOPSS) and several other competitions. For example, a student from the Igbonla College won the ANCOPSS National Essay Competition in 1992. The foundation principal for Igbonla, James Akinola Paseda, doubled as the coordinating principal for the five model colleges at inception in February 1988. The foundation principal for Badore was Mrs Arinze while the vice-principal was B.O. Williams.

2003: Restructured as senior school
See Lagos State Junior Model College Badore#History

Management team
Principal: Mr. Ayantunji S.A
Vice-principal Mrs. Alofokhai
Vice-principal Mrs. Ebai

Clubs and associations 
 Jet Club
 Press Club
 Egbe Akomolede
 Boys Scout
 Red Cross
 Computer Club

Notable awards 
 Governor's educational award (2010)
 First position at World environmental day (2012)
 2nd position at Spelling bee (2009)
 1st Position at Spelling Bee (2002)

Former principals 
 Mrs Arinze
 Alhaji Gbadamosi
 Mrs Oyemade Taiwo
 Mrs. Abdukareem Z.I

References 

Educational institutions established in 1988
Boarding schools in Nigeria
Secondary schools in Lagos State
1988 establishments in Nigeria